Leonardo "Léo" Bispo de Souza (born 2 October 1996) is a Brazilian professional basketball player with Flamengo in the NBB.

Professional career

Flamengo (2016–present)

References

1996 births
Living people
Brazilian men's basketball players
Centers (basketball)
Power forwards (basketball)
Basketball players from São Paulo